Eskiçine is a village in the District of Çine, Aydın Province, Turkey. As of 2010 it had a population of 786 people.

References

Villages in Çine District